Dante and Virgil is an 1850 oil on canvas painting by the French academic painter William-Adolphe Bouguereau. It is on display at the Musée d'Orsay in Paris.

The painting depicts a scene from Dante's Divine Comedy, which narrates a journey through Hell by Dante and his guide Virgil. In the scene the author and his guide are looking on as two damned souls are entwined in eternal combat. One of the souls is an alchemist and heretic named Capocchio. He is being bitten on the neck by the trickster Gianni Schicchi, who had used fraud to claim another man's inheritance.

It was Bougereau's third and ultimately unsuccessful attempt to win the coveted Prix de Rome, even though he had submitted a work that he knew would appeal to the judges. He did however succeed in his efforts later in the year when Shepherds Find Zenobia on the Banks of the Araxes won the consolation second prize of the year.

References

External links

1850 paintings
Paintings in the collection of the Musée d'Orsay
Paintings by William-Adolphe Bouguereau
Nude art
Cultural depictions of Dante Alighieri
Cultural depictions of Virgil
Works based on Inferno (Dante)
Demons in art